Miguel Nicolás Walsh is an Argentine mathematician working in number theory and ergodic theory. He has previously held a Clay Research Fellowship and was a fellow of Merton College at the University of Oxford. He is a professor of mathematics at the University of Buenos Aires.

He received the MCA Prize in 2013. In 2014, he was awarded the ICTP Ramanujan Prize for his contributions to mathematics. He is the youngest recipient to date of both awards.

In June 2017 Walsh was invited to present his research at the 2018 International Congress of Mathematicians in Rio de Janeiro, Brazil.

Selected publications

References

External links 
Walsh's homepage at the University of Oxford
lanacion.com – El matemático argentino Miguel Walsh, de 26 años, ganó el premio Ramanujan (in Spanish)
mincyt – Interview with Miguel Walsh
ICTP – 2014 Ramanujan Prize Announced

Argentine mathematicians
1987 births
Living people
Fellows of Merton College, Oxford
University of Buenos Aires alumni
Number theorists